Sonora is a state in Mexico.

Sonora may also refer to:

Geography

Cities and towns
 Sonora, Arizona
 Sonora, Arkansas
 Sonora, California
 Sonora, Kentucky
 Sonora, Missouri, a ghost town
 Sonora, Ohio, an unincorporated community
 Sonora, Texas
 Sonora, Mato Grosso do Sul, a town in Brazil
 Sonora, Nova Scotia, Canada

Other geography
 Republic of Sonora, a former federal republic in northern Mexico
 Sonoran Desert, a desert in northwestern Mexico and the southwestern United States
 Sonora, a residential subdivision built by M/I Homes in Brown Township, Hendricks County, Indiana in the United States
 Sonora Island, one of the Discovery Islands in British Columbia, Canada
 Sonora Reef, a reef off the west coast of Grays Harbor County, Washington
 Sonora River, a river in Sonora, Mexico

Other uses
 Sonora (snake), genus of snakes in the family Colubridae
 Sonora High School, a high school in La Habra, California
 Sonora High School (Texas)
 Sonora Matancera, a Cuban band
 Sonora Santanera, a Mexican band
 Sonora (also Felicidad and Nuestra Señora de Guadalupe), a Spanish schooner captained by Juan Francisco de la Bodega y Quadra
 Sonora (Mexico City Metrobús), a BRT station in Mexico City

See also
 Sonoma (disambiguation)